Leucopogon glabellus is a species of flowering plant in the family Ericaceae and is endemic to the south-west of Western Australia. It is an erect, glabrous shrub with slender branchlets, heart-shaped to lance-shaped leaves, and cylindrical spikes of white flowers.

Description
The flowers are arranged in cylindrical, many-flowered spikes on the ends of branches with small, leaf-like bracts and bracteoles less than half as long as the sepals.

Taxonomy
Leucopogon glabellus was first formally described in 1810 by Robert Brown in his Prodromus Florae Novae Hollandiae et Insulae Van Diemen . The specific epithet (glabellus) means "glabrous".

Distribution and habitat
This leucopogon grows in winter-wet places, on granite outcrops and on hills and is widespread in the Avon Wheatbelt, Esperance Plains, Jarrah Forest, Mallee, Swan Coastal Plain and Warren bioregions of south-western Western Australia.

References

glabellus
Ericales of Australia
Flora of Western Australia
Plants described in 1810
Taxa named by Robert Brown (botanist, born 1773)